Briggsiopsis is a monotypic genus of flowering plants belonging to the family Gesneriaceae. It contains only one known species, Briggsiopsis delavayi 

Its native range is southern central China.

The genus is named in honour of Munro Briggs Scott (1889–1917), a Scottish botanist and British officer who was killed in WW I.

References

Didymocarpoideae
Gesneriaceae genera
Flora of South-Central China